Nickelback  is a Canadian rock band formed in 1995 in Hanna, Alberta. It is composed of guitarist and lead vocalist Chad Kroeger, guitarist, keyboardist and backing vocalist Ryan Peake, bassist Mike Kroeger and drummer Daniel Adair. It went through several drummer changes between 1995 and 2005, reaching its current lineup when Adair replaced Ryan Vikedal.

The band signed with Roadrunner Records in 1999 and reached a mainstream breakthrough in 2002 with the hit single "How You Remind Me", which reached number one in the United States and Canada. Its parent album, Silver Side Up, would go on to be certified 8× Platinum in Canada. Nickelback's fourth album, The Long Road, was released in 2003 and spawned five singles, including Canadian number one "Someday", which also reached No. 7 on the Billboard Hot 100. 

In 2005, the band's best-selling album to date, All the Right Reasons, produced three top-ten and five top-twenty singles on the Billboard Hot 100, including "Photograph", "Far Away", and "Rockstar", the latter of which was their biggest hit in the United Kingdom. Nickelback released eight singles from their sixth album Dark Horse (2008), including the United States top ten hit "Gotta Be Somebody". In 2011, the seventh album Here and Now topped the charts in Canada. The band has since released No Fixed Address (2014), Feed the Machine (2017) and most recently its tenth album Get Rollin' (2022).

Nickelback is one of the most commercially successful Canadian rock bands, having sold more than 50 million albums worldwide. In 2009, Billboard ranked it the most successful rock group and the seventh-most successful artist of that decade; "How You Remind Me" was the best-selling rock song and the fourth-best overall. In 2023, Nickelback were inducted into the Canadian Music Hall of Fame.

History

Formation (1995)
The band was formed in the early 1990s as a cover band called "Village Idiot"
by brothers Mike and Chad Kroeger with their cousin Brandon Kroeger and Ryan Peake. The band later changed its name to Nickelback, which originated from the nickel in change that band member Mike Kroeger gave customers at his job at Starbucks; he would frequently say, "Here's your nickel back."
The band performed covers of songs from Led Zeppelin and Metallica. Chad Kroeger then asked his step-father to loan him $4,000 CAD so that the band could record their first demo, a seven-track EP of original material, called Hesher (1996).
The band spent half the money to record the EP, while Kroeger spent the other half on magic mushrooms to resell.

Curb and The State (1996–2000)
In 1996, the band recorded and released their first full-length album, Curb. "Fly" was included on both Hesher and Curb and was the first single produced by Nickelback. In 1997, Brandon Kroeger left the band and the band searched for a new drummer. Later that year Mitch Guindon joined the band, but he decided to leave in 1998. While initially reported due to him starting work at a car company, Guindon's departure came due to him "not [being] meant for the road". Chad Kroeger stated that his skin was not able to handle cold weather and they convinced him to leave. In Summer 1998, Ryan Vikedal joined the band.

Roadrunner A&R Ron Burman told HitQuarters that one of his West Coast scouts sent him the self-released album and, suitably impressed, he travelled to Vancouver to see them perform live. Although an unknown property in the industry at the time, the venue was packed out. In Burman's words: "I immediately got the chills! I thought their song "Leader of Men" was a smash hit." Off the stage he was impressed by their industry and initiative in managing their career. Despite this, it still took Burman three months for him to convince his label bosses to approve the signing, a decision that would mark Roadrunner's first move into mainstream rock. Nickelback signed a record deal with EMI and Roadrunner Records in 1999.

The State was released by Nickelback in 2000 by Roadrunner Records and EMI Canada, followed by its release in Europe in 2001. It spawned 4 singles: "Old Enough", "Worthy to Say", "Leader of Men" and "Breathe", the last two being Top 10 rock hits. The album was the band's first album to be certified gold status and it later went into platinum status in 2008, after the success of their later albums. The album entered the Billboard 200 at number 130 and peaked at number 3 in the Billboard Top Heatseekers albums chart and peaked at number 6 on the Billboard Top Independent albums chart.

Silver Side Up and The Long Road (2001–2004) 
Around 2001, Chad Kroeger started "studying every piece, everything sonically, everything lyrically, everything musically, chord structure. I would dissect every single song that I would hear on the radio or every song that had ever done well on a chart and I would say, 'Why did this do well?'" Kroeger said that Nickelback's single "How You Remind Me" sold so well because it was about romantic relationships, a universal subject, and contained memorable hooks.

To record their third album Silver Side Up, Nickelback collaborated with producer Rick Parashar. The album was written before the release of The State and was recorded at the same studio. The album was released on Tuesday, September 11, 2001. The album peaked at number two on the Billboard 200 with over 177,000 copies sold in its first week and peaked at number one at the Canadian albums chart, making it the band's first album to do so. The single "How You Remind Me" was a number one single on the Mainstream and Modern rock charts, as well as the pop chart. It also peaked at number two on Adult Top 40 and became the Billboard Hot 100 number one single of the year for 2002. The next single was "Too Bad", which also reached number one on the Mainstream Rock Chart. The final single from the album was "Never Again", which also hit number one on Mainstream Rock.

In 2002, Chad Kroeger collaborated with Josey Scott on the Spider-Man theme song, "Hero". This recording also featured Tyler Connolly, Mike Kroeger, Matt Cameron, and Jeremy Taggart. In 2002, Nickelback released their first DVD Live at Home. On August 19, 2002, an incident occurred while the band was performing at the Ilha do Ermal festival in Portugal. While performing the second song of their set, Chad Kroeger was sprayed with a full bottle of water hurled from somewhere within the audience. After finishing the song, Chad asked the crowd, "Do you want to hear some rock 'n' roll or do you want to go home?" A person in the audience then threw a rock at Chad's head. The band then left stage, with Chad and Vikedal giving the finger to the audience as they left. The band's label, Roadrunner, posted video footage of the entire incident on their website.

In 2003, Nickelback released The Long Road. The album was certified 3× Platinum by the RIAA in March 2005 and it had sold 3,591,000 copies as of April 2011. It has sold over 5 million copies worldwide and, in 2003 alone, the album sold 2 million copies worldwide. It debuted at No. 6 on the Billboard 200. This was their first album produced by Joey Moi, a former classmate of the band's.

The Long Road was ranked No. 157 on Billboard'''s 200 Albums of the Decade. It spawned five singles. The lead single was "Someday". The band also released "Feelin' Way Too Damn Good" as a single, which peaked at number three on the Mainstream Rock Charts. "Figured You Out" was also released as a single and topped the Mainstream Rock Charts for 13 consecutive weeks.

All the Right Reasons (2005–2007)
Just after New Year's Day 2005, drummer Ryan Vikedal was replaced by 3 Doors Down's drummer Daniel Adair. Nickelback promptly went into the studio with their new drummer from January through May 2005. The sessions resulted in their fifth studio album, All the Right Reasons which was released on October 3, 2005. It peaked at number one on the Billboard 200 with 323,350 copies in its first week in the United States, as well as producing five U.S. Hot 100 top 20 singles: "Photograph", "Savin' Me", "Far Away", "If Everyone Cared" and "Rockstar". Three of these became U.S. Hot 100 top 10 singles. Also, the album peaked at number one on the Canadian albums chart. The album sold more than 12 million singles and over 9 million ringtones. The album also made Nickelback the first band in Nielsen BDS history to have 5 singles on the CHR charts.  It included appearances by Billy Gibbons of ZZ Top, who played a guitar solo on the song "Follow You Home" and sang backing vocals on "Rock Star"—and a posthumously sampled appearance by Chad Kroeger's friend Dimebag Darrell from Pantera, culled from guitar outtakes. All the Right Reasons had sold over 7 million copies in the U.S. to June 19, 2010.

The band spent much of 2006 and 2007 touring across the globe. In the fall of 2006, the band opened for Bon Jovi on the European leg of the Have a Nice Day Tour. Over 2 million fans attended Nickelback's shows during those two years.

The band played at Sturgis, South Dakota to over 35,000 people at the 2006 Sturgis Bike Rally. The performance was filmed with 15 high-definition cameras. They released the DVD and Blu-ray of it in 2009, several years after the performance. In November 2006, the band won an American Music Award for best pop/rock album, surprising the band itself. "We just kinda showed up because we were supposed to give one of these away tonight," Chad Kroeger said after receiving the award. Chad Kroeger added he had thought the Red Hot Chili Peppers would win the award.

Dark Horse (2008–2010)
After taking much of 2007 off, the band started recording a new album in earnest. In July 2008, the band signed with Live Nation for three touring and album cycles, with an option for a fourth. On September 4, 2008, it was announced that the first single from the upcoming album would be "If Today Was Your Last Day", to be released on September 30, 2008. This announcement was however never confirmed: Roadrunner Records actually chose to release another song, "Gotta Be Somebody," as the first single. It became Nickelback's 5th and so far final single to hit the No. 1 spot on the U.S. Adult Top 40 chart. The new album, produced by Mutt Lange and titled Dark Horse, was released on November 18, 2008. "Something in Your Mouth" was released as the second single to rock radio only on December 15, 2008, where it reached number one. "If Today Was Your Last Day" was eventually released as a single after all on March 31, 2009: it became the third single from the album. Four more singles were released later in 2009, "I'd Come for You", "Burn It to the Ground" and "Never Gonna Be Alone" released in September and "Shakin' Hands" as the seventh single on November 16. Its eighth single, "This Afternoon", was released on March 23, 2010. Dark Horse was certified platinum by the Recording Industry Association of America (RIAA) on December 9, 2008, only three weeks after its North American release.  All eight singles were major hits which finished at or near the top of at least one high-profile chart.

On November 26, 2008, the band announced the tour for the support of the album. Live Nation produced the tour and the band kicked off in Nashville, Tennessee, with Seether, and Saving Abel as their opening acts. The band then announced that they were about to tour in the UK with Black Stone Cherry as their opening act. The band then announced the second leg of the tour of North America with the opening acts being Hinder, Papa Roach, and once again, Saving Abel. The band then went on tour around Australia and New Zealand with Sick Puppies as their supporting act. For the second leg of the Europe tour, the band played with their opening act Daughtry. The third leg of the North America tour kicked off with Breaking Benjamin, Sick Puppies and Shinedown opening up for the band. The band concluded their tour with the fourth leg in North America which included Buckcherry and Three Days Grace. The tour was very successful and the band sold over 1.6 million tickets with 146 shows.

The album also remained in the top 20 on the Billboard 200 for weeks after its release. The album was certified two times platinum in April 2009, and had by April 2010 sold over 3 million copies in the U.S. However, critical reception of the album has been mostly mixed to negative. In 2009, the band won three Juno Awards for Juno Fan Choice Award, group of the year, and album of the year; the band performed their single "Something in Your Mouth" at the ceremony. In 2010, Billboard year end charts listed Dark Horse as the top-selling rock and metal album of the year. The band was also listed at the top selling hard rock artist. On January 29, 2010, they released a Tap-Tap rhythm game for on the App Store, contrary to the band's prior comments against other music related video games such as Guitar Hero.
On February 28, 2010, Nickelback gave a performance at the beginning of the concert portion of the 2010 Winter Olympics closing ceremony, performing "Burn It to the Ground". In October 2010 Nickelback finished their Dark Horse Tour.

Here and Now (2011–2013)
Chad Kroeger said in an interview with Billboard.com in September 2010 that songwriting for the next Nickelback album was planned to commence as early as February 2011 with "about four tunes" already in mind. Adair mentioned that the band wanted to go back to the musical style of All The Right Reasons, which he described as "more organic".

Nickelback announced their new album, Here and Now, on September 8, 2011, along with its two lead singles, "Bottoms Up" and "When We Stand Together". Kroeger said "We're four people who love making music, the way we like to make it. We entered the studio this year with a vision, and it all came together. We're extremely happy with the results, and can't wait to share them with our fans." The album was released on November 21, 2011, with the band calling it "Nickelblack Monday", a play on Nickelback and Black Monday. Two singles were released to radio stations on September 26, and September 27 for purchase on iTunes. Here and Now peaked at number two on the Billboard 200, selling 226,714 copies in its first week of release, with Christmas by Michael Bublé taking number one by a margin of only 419 copies.

As part of promotion for the album, Nickelback was booked to perform at the halftime shows for both an NFL Thanksgiving Day game at Ford Field in Detroit on November 24, and the 99th Grey Cup in the band's hometown of Vancouver on November 27. Also, as a promotion the band played to Jimmy Kimmel upon the album's release. The band is nominated for 4 Juno Awards in 2012, and scheduled to perform at the ceremony. Nickelback announced their Here and Now Tour on January 11, 2012, they are going to tour with Seether, Bush and My Darkest Days. The band released a music video for their fourth single off of the album Lullaby. The band officially announced the compilation album The Best of Nickelback Volume 1 through social media on October 3, 2013. Frontman Chad Kroeger had previously stated in an interview that the greatest hits album was to feature songs from previous albums along with new songs but the unveiled track listing ultimately contained only previously released material.

No Fixed Address and Feed the Machine (2014–2018)
According to an interview with Chad Kroeger on CFOX-FM, the band planned to release their eighth studio album before the end of 2014. The lead rock single was also announced, "Edge of a Revolution", was released in August 2014. The track was described as a "departure" for Nickelback and a political song. Frequent collaborator Chris Lord-Alge returned to mix some of the tracks on the album. It was also announced the band had signed to Republic Records. The lead single from the album is titled "Edge of a Revolution", and was scheduled to be sent for adds on Rock radio and be released to iTunes on August 18. The lead pop single, and second overall, was announced to be "What Are You Waiting For?", and was released in September. "What Are You Waiting For?" was released as a single on digital retailers on September 9, 2014. On August 22, 2014, Nickelback announced the album's title to be No Fixed Address, and released it on November 17, 2014.

No Fixed Address Tour was their fifth headlining concert tour, in support of No Fixed Address. The tour was announced on November 5, 2014, as well as The Pretty Reckless, Pop Evil, and Lifehouse as the support act for the majority of the shows in North American while Monster Truck was support act in Australia and Europe (2016). The second North American leg of the tour had to be canceled when lead vocalist Chad Kroeger required surgery for a cyst on his voice box. The entire leg of the European tour was postponed until Autumn 2016.

On August 19, 2016, Nickelback released a cover of Don Henley's song "Dirty Laundry" to streaming services. On January 23, 2017, a new single, "Feed the Machine" was announced to be released on February 1, alongside specific details of a 2017 tour. On January 25, Nickelback signed with BMG Rights Management to release their ninth album, also titled Feed the Machine. The album was released on June 16, 2017. The band released their second single from the album, "Song on Fire", on April 28, 2017. Shortly after the release of the album, the band began a 44-city tour on June 23, 2017, in North America, co-headlined with Daughtry, Shaman's Harvest and Cheap Trick as supporting acts.

===Get Rollin (2019–present)===
In early 2019, band members spoke of recording a tenth studio album, though Chad Kroeger conceded there was no timetable or rush for the band to complete it. Mike Kroeger spoke of his personal desire to move in more of a heavy metal direction, or wanting to do an album of Slayer cover songs.

On August 14, 2020, the band released a cover of The Charlie Daniels Band song "The Devil Went Down to Georgia", featuring Dave Martone.

In a July 2021 interview bassist Mike Kroeger commented when asked about the band's progress on new music saying "That is happening right now, music is being composed and recorded up in Canada. We were out there, and something came up and our producer had to take some time off. So I took that opportunity to return home to Los Angeles with family and spend a little time at home but I'll be headed back up there in a couple of weeks to pick it up again." When asked about a potential timeframe for a release date, Kroeger said "it'll be done when it's done", explaining that the band would rather not be confined to a timescale for fear of making "a shitty record". "Release dates are primarily arrived at by business interests, like record labels and whatever. We don't have one of those", he said. "We've been managing ourselves for about a year. So, the answer is no. We're doing it on our schedule, at our own pace, and it'll be done when it's done. 'Cause we've blown up deadlines in the past lots of times. Because we feel that you can make a good record and be late, but you can't, or you shouldn't, make a shitty record to be on time. So we won't be pressed for time.

In August 2022, Nickelback began posting small snippets and teasers of new music via their official social media accounts with the date "09.07.2022" being branded on the posts.

On August 26, 2022, students attending school at Simon Fraser University in Burnaby, British Columbia received a newsletter stating they were invited to attend and participate in a video shoot Nickelback would be hosting on August 30, 2022, for their single, outside the Convocation Mall on campus.

The album title was revealed to be Get Rollin'. The lead single "San Quentin" was released on September 7, 2022. The band is set to embark on its "Get Rollin' Tour" with opening acts Brantley Gilbert and Josh Ross. They will perform on thirty-eight dates in Canada and the United States from June 2023 to August 2023.

Musical style and influences
Nickelback has been described as various genres, including post-grunge, hard rock, pop rock, alternative rock, heavy metal, alternative metal, and nu metal. Their earlier sound has been classified as grunge.

Nickelback have cited bands and musicians such as Creedence Clearwater Revival, Bob Marley, Metallica, Nirvana, Red Hot Chili Peppers,
and U2 as influential or inspirational.

Reception

Review aggregator Metacritic reports that five of Nickelback's six most recent studio albums since becoming a mainstream act—The Long Road, All the Right Reasons, Dark Horse, Here and Now, and No Fixed Address—have scores of 62, 41, 49, 51, and 54, respectively, out of 100, indicating generally mixed reviews. AllMusic reviewer Liana Jones gave their first commercially successful album, Silver Side Up, 3 stars out of 5, and complimented their "intensity and raw passion" and realistic storytelling.

Despite their commercial success, Nickelback has been the subject of numerous jokes and a vocal negative response for some audiences, some of which is attributed to the perceived derivative, repetitive and formulaic nature of their music, as well as their over-use of hedonistic themes involving strippers, sex, prostitutes, drugs, and alcohol consumption. However, in a review for the band's ninth album Feed the Machine, AllMusic reviewer Stephen Thomas Erlewine noted that they had mostly done away with the crude and vulgar lyrical content they'd become known for, and praised the band for evolving their sound. In the 2010s, Nickelback became the subject of internet memes that were critical of their music, a status that the band came to embrace. In May 2013, the readers of Rolling Stone magazine named Nickelback the second-worst band of the 1990s, behind only Creed. In November 2011, users of the music-oriented dating site Tastebuds.fm voted Nickelback as the number one "musical turnoff". In March 2019, U.S. representatives Mark Pocan and Rodney Davis got into a friendly debate on the merits of the band while speaking on the floor of the House of Representatives. In an interview in 2014, Kroeger commented that the criticism helped him "grow a thick skin", and that without it, they would be "this just whatever band".

Following their 2008 album, Dark Horse, ChartAttack credited the band's success to knowing their target audience: "Chad Kroeger is a genius because he knows exactly what people want and precisely how far he can go. He turned out an extremely racy album that's loaded with songs about gettin' drunk and doin' it all without breaking any taboos, and with enough love and moral authority to grease its passage into the mainstream. Rejoice, North America. This is your world." Billboard gave praise to the band: "The bulletproof Nickelback provides affordable fun that promises good returns in hard times." Various fellow musicians, like Chris Martin of Coldplay as well as producer Timbaland and singer Keyshia Cole, have publicly shown support for the band.

Band membersCurrent members Chad Kroeger – lead vocals, lead and rhythm guitar (1995–present)
 Ryan Peake – rhythm and lead guitar, backing vocals (1995–present); keyboards (2002–present)
 Mike Kroeger – bass (1995–present)
 Daniel Adair – drums, percussion, backing vocals (2005–present)Former members Brandon Kroeger – drums (1995–1997)
 Mitch Guindon – drums (1997–1998)
 Ryan Vikedal – drums, percussion (1998–2005)

Timeline

DiscographyStudio albums'Curb (1996)The State (1998)Silver Side Up (2001)The Long Road (2003)All the Right Reasons (2005)Dark Horse (2008)Here and Now (2011)No Fixed Address (2014)Feed the Machine (2017) Get Rollin' ''(2022)

Awards

2003 – Won SOCAN International Achievement Award for the song "How You Remind Me"
2004 – Won SOCAN International Achievement Award
2005 – Won SOCAN International Achievement Award
2007 – Won SOCAN International Achievement Award
2008 – Won SOCAN International Achievement Award

References

External links

 
Atlantic Records artists
1995 establishments in Alberta
Canadian alternative metal musical groups
Canadian hard rock musical groups
Canadian heavy metal musical groups
Canadian pop rock music groups
Canadian post-grunge groups
Juno Award for Single of the Year winners
Musical groups established in 1995
Musical groups from Alberta
Musical quartets
Republic Records artists
Roadrunner Records artists
Juno Award for Album of the Year winners
Juno Award for Breakthrough Group of the Year winners
Juno Award for Rock Album of the Year winners
Juno Award for Group of the Year winners
Juno Fan Choice Award winners
Musical families